Strays is the fourth studio album by American country musician Margo Price, released on January 13, 2023, by Loma Vista Recordings. The album was produced by Price with musician Jonathan Wilson at his Fivestar Studio in Topanga Canyon, and features contributions from Mike Campbell (formerly of Tom Petty and the Heartbreakers, and whom Price recorded with for the second Dirty Knobs album, External Combustion), Sharon Van Etten, and Lucius.

Promotion
Alongside recording the album, Price completed a memoir, Maybe We'll Make It, released in October 2022 by University of Texas Press. Price completed a book tour through November 2022 and then opened the "'Til the Wheels Fall Off Tour" in December 2022, with plans to promote Strays through March 2023.

The first single released from Strays was "Been to the Mountain". on August 25, 2022. When Price announced the album in September 2022, she also released the second single, "Change of Heart". Further, in November 2022, a third single, "Lydia", was released in promotion of the album, a song Price described as "a moving collection of words about bodily autonomy and women's rights" and noted was inspired by her passing a women's health clinic years earlier on tour in Vancouver, and recorded prior to the United States Supreme Court overturned Roe v. Wade in June 2022.

Track listing

Personnel
Musicians

 Margo Price – vocals (all tracks); bells, maracas, tambourine (track 1); percussion (2, 4, 7, 8), acoustic guitar (3, 7, 9)
 Alex Muňoz – 12-string acoustic guitar, background vocals (all tracks); electric guitar (1–8, 10), baritone guitar (3, 10), acoustic guitar (4, 5), pedal steel guitar (5, 7, 10)
 Jamie Davis – acoustic guitar, background vocals (all tracks); electric guitar (1–6, 8, 10)
 Jeremy Ivey – acoustic guitar (all tracks), bass guitar (3, 8)
 Dillon Napier – drums (1–7, 10), drum machine (3), percussion (4, 5)
 Micah Hulscher – keyboards (all tracks), organ (1, 2, 4–7), piano (1–3, 5–8, 10), synthesizer (1–3, 5–7, 10), harpsichord (1, 2), celesta (6)
 Kevin Black – bass guitar (2, 4–7)
 Mike Campbell – electric guitar (2)
 Jonathan Wilson – Moog bass (3, 6, 8); guitar, timpani (3); bells, piano (6); acoustic guitar, castanets, tambourine (7); percussion (8, 10)
 Sharon Van Etten – vocals (3)
 Ny Oh – vocals (5, 10)
 Dexter Green – drums (8)
 Jess Wolfe – vocals (8)
 Holly Laessig – vocals (8)
 Jacob Braun – cello (9)
 Zach Dellinger – viola (9)
 Andrew Bullbrook – violin (9)
 Wynton Grant – violin (9)

Technical
 Jonathan Wilson – production, recording production, mixing (all tracks); engineering (3)
 Margo Price – co-production (all tracks); recording production, engineering (3); music production (6)
 Dexter Green – co-production (3, 8); music production, engineering (6)
 Lawrence Rothman – co-production, engineering (7)
 Adam Ayan – mastering
 Grant Milliken – engineering (1, 2, 5, 10)
 Parker Cason – engineering (4, 9)
 Joe Trentacosti – engineering (6), engineering assistance (3)
 Louis Rememapp – engineering (7)
 Anita Agoyan-Miu – engineering assistance (1, 2, 5, 10)
 Liv Painter – engineering assistance (7)
 Frankie Fingers – engineering assistance (9)

References

2023 albums
Margo Price albums
Loma Vista Recordings albums